Živinice is a town and municipality in northeastern Bosnia and Herzegovina.

Živinice may also refer to:

In Bosnia and Herzegovina:
Živinice (Derventa), a village in the municipality of Derventa, Republika Srpska
Živinice (Kneževo), a village in the municipality of Kneževo, Republika Srpska

In Serbia:
Živinice (Priboj), а village in the municipality of Priboj, Zlatibor District